Marcus N'Ze Kouassi (born 7 April 1987) is an Italian footballer of Ghanaian origin who plays for Italian Eccellenza club Montorio FC.

Biography
Born in Sekondi, Ghana, N'Ze moved to Italy at young age. He started his career at Verona for Chievo. He graduated from youth team in 2005 and left for Serie D club Canavese, which he spent 2 seasons.

In July 2007, he left for Sansovino in co-ownership deal along with Leonardo Moracci, Xhulian Rrudho. Antonino Saviano, Luca Spinetti and Maycol Andriani. In June 2008, Chievo bought back N'Ze by winning an auction between the two clubs. but after few weeks left Verona to sign for Serie D club Domegliara. In 2009–10 season, he played 33 times and scored 1 goal.

In 2010–11 Serie D he left for Virtus Verona.

After Allegrini's retirement, he became the new captain of Virtus Verona at the start of 2018–19 season.

For the 2019–20 season, he joined GSD Ambrosiana in Serie D. In June 2020, he joined fellow league club Caldiero Terme. In June 2022, N'ze moved to Eccellenza club Montorio FC.

Personal life 
His brother Desmond N'Ze is also a professional footballer.

Honours
Serie D/A: 2007

References

External links
 Lega Calcio Profile 
 
 LaSerieD.com Profile 

1986 births
People from Sekondi-Takoradi
Living people
Ghanaian footballers
Association football fullbacks
Ghanaian emigrants to Italy
Italian sportspeople of African descent
A.C. ChievoVerona players
A.C. Sansovino players
S.S.D. Domegliara players
Serie C players
Serie D players